Zhabokrych is a village in Ukraine's Podolia region in present-day Tulchyn Raion, Vinnytsia Oblast, about 290 kilometres (180 miles) northwest of Odessa. It is located at 48° 23' 0" North, 28° 59' 0" East. and 11 km from Kryzhopil.

The town name means frog croak and the climate is continental.

History
In the town square are many buildings remaining from early in the 20th century. Prior to World War II it had a large Jewish community. A synagogue and Jewish cemetery still remain. There were massacres  in July 1941 and in 1944.

References

External links
 The murder of the Jews of Zhabokrych during World War II, at Yad Vashem website.
Holocaust locations in Ukraine

Shtetls
Olgopolsky Uyezd
Villages in Tulchyn Raion